Dracula pusilla is a species of orchid.

pusilla